Les 3 Jours de Vaucluse is a road bicycle race held annually in the French department of Vaucluse. It is contested over three days. The first edition was held in 2007; it is classified as a 2.2 event on the UCI Europe Tour.

Winners

External links
Official Website

Recurring sporting events established in 2007
2007 establishments in France
UCI Europe Tour races
Cycle races in France